The Prisoner of the Maharaja is a 1954 West German adventure film directed by Veit Harlan and starring Kristina Söderbaum, Willy Birgel, and Adrian Hoven. It is a sequel to the 1953 film Stars Over Colombo.

Cast

References

Bibliography

External links 
 

1954 films
1954 adventure films
German adventure films
West German films
1950s German-language films
Films directed by Veit Harlan
Films shot in Sri Lanka
German sequel films
Gloria Film films
1950s German films